The CBS Kidshow (originally known as Think CBS Kids) was an American Saturday morning children's programming block that aired on CBS from September 13, 1997 to September 9, 2000. Originally a network-programmed block, Canada-based Nelvana took over programming responsibilities on October 3, 1998.

History

Think CBS Kids
In 1997, taking advantage of the tightened Children's Television Act regulations instituted the previous year by the Federal Communications Commission that required broadcasters to carry three hours of educational programming each week, CBS launched an all-"educational/informational" Saturday morning lineup for the 1997-98 season, known as Think CBS Kids (which served as both the block's branding and tagline). The block consisted entirely of live-action series (marking the first time that CBS did not feature animated series within its children's program lineup) – including the youth-oriented game show Wheel 2000 (a spin-off of the syndicated game show Wheel of Fortune), which aired simultaneously on the Game Show Network; Sports Illustrated for Kids (a series based on the youth-oriented magazine spun off from Sports Illustrated); The Weird Al Show; Fudge; The New Ghostwriter Mysteries (a revival of the popular PBS television series); and Beakman's World. The one-minute youth-oriented series of segments, In the News, was also briefly revived as part of the new block, hosted by Dan Raviv, a Washington, D.C.-based correspondent for CBS Radio News. Think CBS Kids suffered from low ratings as a whole, resulting in the network canceling most of the block's shows after four months. Fudge was subsequently replaced by reruns of CBS Storybreak (the show and Beakman's World were both carried over from the network's previous children's block CBS Kidz).

Relaunch as the CBS Kidshow
In January 1998, CBS entered into a programming agreement with the Canada-based animation studio Nelvana to program the Saturday morning time slot allocated to children's programming. Think CBS Kids was planned to relaunch as the CBS Kidshow on September 19 of that year, but CBS delayed the block's relaunch to October 3. The new block featured several first-run series co-produced by Nelvana, CBS and Scottish Television such as Anatole, Mythic Warriors, Rescue Heroes and Flying Rhino Junior High. The premiere of Mythic Warriors was further delayed due to its complicated animation techniques; reruns of Tales from the Cryptkeeper (with a revival aired in a year later) aired in Mythic Warriors''' timeslot until it premiered on November 7.

In June 2000, a few months after Viacom (which CBS founded in 1952 as television syndication distributor CBS Films, Inc., and later spun off in 1971 after the then-recently implemented Financial Interest and Syndication Rules barred networks from holding financial interest in syndicated programming content) completed its $37 billion merger with CBS Corporation (which was the original Westinghouse Electric Corporation that purchased CBS in 1995), CBS reached an agreement with new corporate cousin Nickelodeon to air programming from the cable channel's preschool-oriented block Nick Jr. beginning that September. Prior to the deal, former Nick Jr. series Rupert moved to the CBS Kidshow block in January 1999, as part of an agreement in which both it and another animated series, Franklin, swapped networks (with Franklin moving from CBS to the Nick Jr. block on Nickelodeon). The CBS Kidshow block ended its run on September 9, 2000, and was replaced the following week on September 16 by Nick Jr. on CBS, which featured two Nelvana series - the aforementioned Franklin and Little Bear; several other Nelvana series from Nickelodeon and Nick Jr. continued to air on CBS until September 9, 2006, after which, the Nickelodeon block was replaced with KOL Secret Slumber Party as a result of Viacom and CBS demerging earlier that year. Before that, Nelvana then proceeded to create a new Saturday-morning cartoon block, the Bookworm Bunch (so named because all of that block's series were adaptations of children's books), for CBS' non-commercial rival, PBS, which premiered two weeks later.  Several of the series were also rerun in Scotland as part of co-producer STV's wknd@stv block in the early 2010s.

Programming

Scheduling variances and pre-emptions
Although the block was intended to air on Saturday mornings, some CBS affiliates deferred some programs over the course of the Think CBS Kids/CBS Kidshow block's run to Sunday or early Saturday morning time slots or tape delayed the entire block in order to accommodate local weekend morning newscasts, CBS News Saturday Morning (which debuted alongside Think CBS Kids, and was later replaced in 1999 by the Saturday edition of The Early Show) or other programs of local interest (for example, then-affiliate KTVT in Fort Worth, Texas – now owned-and-operated by CBS – aired the Think CBS Kids block from 9:00 to 11:00 a.m. on Saturdays and 7:00 to 8:00 a.m. on Sundays from 1997 to 1998). Other stations pre-empted some programs outright for these same reasons, as well as due to professional and college sports broadcasts scheduled by CBS (especially in the case of college football and basketball tournaments) or its stations (primarily through sports syndication services), although most affiliates aired the block in its entirety.

Former programming

Think CBS Kids
 Beakman's World (1997–1998)
 CBS Storybreak (1998)
 Fudge (1997; reruns of ABC series)
 The New Ghostwriter Mysteries (1997)
 The Sports Illustrated for Kids Show (1997)
 The Weird Al Show (1997–1998)
 Wheel 2000 (1997–1998)

CBS KidshowThe Adventures of Shimajiro (1999–2000) (scrapped)
 Anatole (1998–2000)
 Birdz (1998–1999)
 Blaster's Universe (1999–2000)
 Dumb Bunnies (1998–1999)
 Flying Rhino Junior High (1998–2000)
 Franklin (1998–1999)
 Mythic Warriors (1998–2000)
 Rescue Heroes (1999–2000)
 Rupert (1999)
 Tales from the Cryptkeeper'' (1998; 1999–2000)

References

Television programming blocks in the United States
Kidshow
Children's television networks in the United States
1997 American television series debuts
2000 American television series endings